"The Swing" is a song written by Robert Ellis Orrall and Bob Regan, and recorded by American country music artist James Bonamy.  It was released in March 1997 as the lead single from the album Roots and Wings.  The song reached number 31 on the Billboard Hot Country Singles & Tracks chart and peaked at number 16 on the Canadian RPM Country Tracks chart.

Music video
The music video was directed by chris rogers and premiered in March 1997. It was filmed in Charleston, South Carolina.

Critical reception
Frank Roberts of The Virginian-Pilot called it a "clever novelty". David Simons of New Country magazine wrote that it was "a catchy boy-meets-girl fiddle stomper."

Chart performance
"The Swing" debuted at number 72 on the U.S. Billboard Hot Country Singles & Tracks for the week of April 5, 1997

References

1997 singles
James Bonamy songs
Songs written by Bob Regan
Songs written by Robert Ellis Orrall
Epic Records singles
Song recordings produced by Doug Johnson (record producer)
1997 songs